Rashid Tetteh (born 14 July 1995) is a Ghanaian footballer who plays as a central defender for FC Tulsa in the USL Championship.

Career statistics

References

External links
Profile at HPU Athletics

1995 births
Living people
North Carolina Fusion U23 players
Des Moines Menace players
New Mexico United players
FC Tulsa players
USL League Two players
USL Championship players
Ghanaian footballers
Ghanaian expatriate footballers
Association football defenders